Mirdif (sometimes referred to as Mirdiff due to differences in transliteration) is a residential area located in Dubai, United Arab Emirates.

Like many areas of Dubai, Mirdif has a cosmopolitan population of approximately 37,000 representing a wide range of nationalities and consists mainly of villa developments, or single privately held villas.

Geography 
Mirdif borders Al Mizhar from the north and Al Warqaa from the south and is adjacent to the Rashidiya Metro station and Dubai International Airport. To the eastern part of Mirdif is the popular Al Mushrif Park.

Culture

Schools
Mirdif has several nurseries and schools, with GCE, GCSE, IB and A level curriculum's:

Nurseries and primary schools 
 Emirates British Nursery
 Small Steps Nursery
 Super Kids Nursery
 Learning Land Nursery
 GEMS Royal Dubai School
 British Orchard Nursery

Secondary schools

International Baccalaureate 
 Mirdiff Private School
 Uptown international School
 Dar Al Marefa

GCE/GCSE 
 Star International School

Sports and Recreation 
 The suburb enjoys a public park at 26b street with basketball, volleyball and tennis courts, as well as a 300-metre walking track, training equipment and extensive play equipment for children. It is open every day from 8:00 to 23:00; Fridays, Saturdays and bank holidays longer.
 The public Al Mushrif park with a size of more than 15 hectares and trees up to 50 years of age offers outdoor recreation.

Shopping 

Mirdif houses various 'collections' of own examples of these 'collections' are:

Mirdif Golden Gate
Pink Mall
Lifco
West Zone

Shopping Malls

Mirdif City Centre 

Mirdif City Centre is a large shopping mall opened on 16 March 2010. The Mirdif City Centre project was first announced in April 2007 with construction beginning in August 2007. It comprises  of gross floor area spread over a service basement level and 1st floor, and  square metres of shopping space.

The mall contains about 465 shops with adjacent 3 level parking for over 7000 cars, a Magic Planet Entertainment zone with an "iFly" indoor skydiving center and Yalla! Bowling, a 12-lane cosmic ten pin bowling attraction. In addition the mall contains A 10-screen cinema featuring two VOX GOLD Premium screens with VOX GOLD lounge and VOX 4DX sensory experience that includes the first “ExtremeScreen” cinema in the UAE as well as a Fitness First gym. City Centre Mirdif houses over 80 restaurants and cafés. Restaurants include Abdel Wahab, Uno Chicago Grill, Japengo, Gazebo. Two food courts offer 34 outlets, restaurant precincts, coffee shops and casual dining

Some leading retailers in Mirdif City Centre include Debenhams, Zara, Virgin Megastore, and Carrefour.

Uptown Mirdif
Uptown Mirdif is an open-air shopping centre which includes  of net lettable space. It was the first large shopping complex in Mirdif. It is directly connected to the property development of the same name, and follows the same aesthetic design.

There is underground parking connected to Uptown Mirdif, which is divided between tenants and visitors.  The centre also has a Fitness First gym, and a food court.

Some leading retailers in Uptown Mirdif include Adidas, and Spinneys.

Property developments

Uptown Mirdif 
Uptown Mirdif is a property project developed by Union Properties. The project's design is inspired by an ancient spa town. The project features over 2000 villas and flats, play areas and recreation facilities, a health care center and a primary school. The entire community is gated, and hence cut off from the rest of Mirdif.

Shorooq Community
Shorooq Community, situated along Algeria street, is a housing development that consists primarily of 3-4 bedroom villas. The property includes a community club house and is located adjacent to Mushrif Park.

Religious sites 
There are 8 mosques in Mirdif spread over the area. 
 83rd street next to West Zone supermarket
 37th street next to Lifco supermarket
 15th street next to Pink Mall
 71st street next to Mirdif Shopping Centre
 47th street next to Uptown Mirdif Park
 Mirdif Grand Mosque
 Ghoroob Mosque
 Shorooq Mosque

References

External links 
City Centre Mirdif Mall

Communities in Dubai